Štefan Rosina (also known as Štofi), born 15 July 1987 in Púchov, Slovakia is a Slovak racing driver racing in GT cars. He has competed successfully in the FIA GT1 World Championship and Porsche Supercup. He is the incumbent Vice Champion in the Fanatec GT2 European Series, driving for True Racing by Reiter Engineering, the KTM works sportscar effort.

Early career and domestic success 
Rosina's start in motorsport came in junior karting formulae where he was vice-champion in the Czech national championships at 13 years old. After a season in Ford Fiesta cup, at 15 years old Rosina started in the Skoda Octavia Cup one-make series (then known as the Česká Pojišťovna Škoda Octavia Cup). He was champion in 2003 and 2004. The first of his two titles was to come in the series finale in somewhat controversial circumstances. Series leader and reigning champion František Došek crashed at the start, failing to recover in the race and losing the championship.

International sportscar debut and first points 
After contesting 3 races of the 2005 FIA GT Championship for Slovakian outfit ARC Bratislava, Rosina returned in 2006 for 8 races of the series. Despite DNFs in three races, the Slovak won his first points at elite level in each of his last three finishes, at Paul Ricard, Dijon and Mugello.

2007-2011 Porsche Supercup 
In 2007 Rosina entered the Porsche Supercup one-make series with the late Walter Lechner's eponymous team. Supercup is a recognised training ground for future GT and DTM stars. Le Mans winner Stéphane Ortelli, triple DTM Champion Rene Rast (against whom Rosina would compete) and German touring car legend Uwe Alzen, and notable Dutch Sportscar pilot Patrick Huisman are all graduates of the series. Winning points in his rookie season, the next year the Slovak would score two podiums, the second at a torrential Silverstone, during which he memorably led the race from eventual winner Sean Edwards. In 2009, his third season in Supercup, Rosina would be rewarded for consistency, with no retirements and an international career best P3 in the championship, narrowly ahead of four time Supercup champion Huisman.

2010 was to be less successful, a second-place finish in the season opener in Bahrain the highlight of a season that saw Rosina finish eighth in the standings. A move to new team Verva Racing for 2011 yielded little more success and the young Slovak moved on.

2011-2013 Lamborghini Reiter works drive 
In 2011, without a full season race seat, Rosina appeared in four rounds of the FIA GT3 European Championship, scoring an unfancied pole position at his home circuit the Slovakiaring in a guest drive for the Lamborghini customer team Leipert Engineering team, ahead of Lamborghini works entry Reiter Engineering's own entrants. Despite a DNF early in the race due to a puncture, his performance was enough to earn a factory drive for Reiter the following season, as halfway through 2012 Reiter brought the Slovak to replace ex-Formula 1 and Le Mans GT class winner Tomas Enge in the FIA GT1 World Championship alongside former Formula 3000 champion and Le Mans class winner Peter Kox. The highlights of this shortened season for Rosina were a win and a podium at each of two Nurburgring races, and a fourth place and strong second at Donington.

2013 saw the Slovak compete in just six races at elite level, initially for Reiter (again partnered with Kox) and Grasser Racing, as the Lamborghini works support transferred to the latter outfit, and finish ninth overall. The high point was a win at Zolder in which Rosina defended the lead for several laps from future multiple time sportscar champion and Porsche works driver Laurens Vanthoor.

Retirement and subsequent return with KTM 
In late 2013 Rosina announced his retirement from racing to focus his business career. His stated intent was to compete only regionally in Slovakia and the Czech Republic. In 2020, however, he would make a surprise return in races of the experimental GTX category of the International GT Open, the Creventic 24hr series, and the DTM Trophy, netting a win and two podiums. This time Rosina was competing for noted motorbike and sports car marque KTM. The car was a high power coupé version of the company's X-Bow track car adapted by Rosina's former stable Reiter Engineering, the KTM GTX Concept.

2021-2022 European GT2 success 
2020's success in GTX was followed by a full KTM works drive in 2021 and 2022 in the Stephane Ratel-run Fanatec GT2 European Series, again partnering with Reiter Engineering under the team name True Racing. 2021 was a success, Rosina and his teammate Sehdi Sarmini taking podiums at Misano and Monza, followed by a win at Spa Francorchamps in the season closer. The latter result was particularly significant, being the first overall win for the marque in international GT racing.

In 2022 the Slovak would return as a genuine contender in GT2, this time partnered with Bronze level prospect Filip Sladecka. After a forgettable start at Imola which yielded a sixth place and a retirement, the next round at the Red Bull Ring saw the pair finish first in race 1, followed by a respectable P4 in class the following day. At the following meeting at Spa, however, he and countryman Sladecka dominated, with a lights to flag victory in the first race, followed by another win from a P3 grid slot in Race 2. This weekend would see the pair take the series lead for the first time with two rounds to go. P3 and a win in two scrappy Valencia races saw Rosina maintain their lead with only the season finale at Paul Ricard to go.

The final round of the season at Paul Ricard started positively for team mate Sladecka and Rosina, in qualifying the pair sealing P1 and P3 on the grid for Race 1 and Race 2 respectively. In the first race, however, a chaotic start saw Sladecka drop initially to third, then to ninth after leaving the track, finally recovering to fourth by the time of the mandated driver changes, a position Rosina eventually converted to P3 by the end of the race. Their title rivals Longin and Saelens took victory for 25 points, leaving the series to be decided in the final race later that day.

Race 2 would be a disappointment. A strong start from P3 moving ahead of the rival High Class Racing Audi would put the Slovak into P2, but as the Audi’s pace won out, this would slip to third. After the driver change, Rosina’s teammate Sladecka and the Audi R8 of Aurelius Rusteika made contact into the Le Beausset corner, ending Sladecka’s race and the KTM True Racing duo's hopes for the GT2 European Series title. With this, Rosina and his team-mate would have to settle for the consolation of being European Vice Champions.

Business 
Educated in business management at Bratislava and Oxford Brookes, Rosina is active in business. He is a senior board member of Slovakian automotive car parts manufacturer Matador Automotive.

Media work 
As Slovakia's most successful sportscar driver, Rosina often acts as colour commentator for Czech and Slovakian live broadcasts of motor racing, particularly Formula 1.  He also starred alongside notable motorsport figures Olaf Manthey and Walter Röhrl in 2022's music video about the Nurburgring, the TF Song (Pineapple King) by British/Austrian rock band the Heizer Monkeys.

Personal life 
Rosina lives in Bratislava, Slovakia, and is married with two children.

Racing record

Complete Porsche Supercup results
(key) (Races in bold indicate pole position – 2 points awarded 2008 onwards in all races) (Races in italics indicate fastest lap)

† Did not finish the race, but was classified as he completed over 90% of the race distance.
‡ Guest driver – Not eligible for points.

Complete GT1 World Championship results

Complete FIA GT Series results

Complete Blancpain GT Series Sprint Cup results

Complete GT2 European Series results

References

External links
 
 

1987 births
Living people
People from Púchov District
Sportspeople from the Trenčín Region
Slovak racing drivers
FIA GT Championship drivers
FIA GT1 World Championship drivers
Porsche Supercup drivers
Blancpain Endurance Series drivers
International GT Open drivers
ADAC GT Masters drivers
24H Series drivers
Phoenix Racing drivers
Walter Lechner Racing drivers
Charouz Racing System drivers
Porsche Carrera Cup Germany drivers